The pistol casebearer (Coleophora multipulvella) is a moth of the family Coleophoridae. It is found in North America, from Virginia to Kansas and northward to Canada. It is also known from California and Utah.

The larvae feed on buds and leaves of apple, cherry, pear, plum and quince. They create a somewhat pistol-shaped case.

References

multipulvella
Moths described in 1878
Moths of North America